This is the discography for the Greek-Swedish electronic musician Steve Angello.

Albums

Studio albums

Compilation albums

Extended plays

Singles

As lead artist 

Notes

As featuring artist

Other releases

 2015: With Eric Prydz – "Bedtime Stories" (unreleased)
 2015: "Feel at Home"
 2015: Dimitri Vegas & Like Mike vs. Steve Angello – "Sentido" (unreleased)
 2014: vs. Wayne & Woods – "I/O"
 2014: With AN21 & Sebjak – "GODS"
 2012: Sebastian Ingrosso, Steve Angello and Alesso – "Eclipse (Why Am I Doing This)" (unreleased)
 2011: With A-Trak – "Higher" (unreleased)
 2005: With Sebastian Ingrosso – "82-83"
 2005: vs. Fuzzy Hair – "In Beat"
 2005: With Audio Bullys – "Get Get Down"
 2005: With Sebastian Ingrosso – "Yeah"
 2005: "Acid"
 2004: "The Look (I Feel Sexy)"
 2004: With Dave Armstrong – "Groove in You"
 2004: "Sansation"

Releases under an alias

As A&P Project (with Eric Prydz)

As Buy Now! (with Sebastian Ingrosso)

As Fireflies (with Sebastian Ingrosso)

As General Moders (with Sebastian Ingrosso)

As Mode Hookers (with Sebastian Ingrosso)

As Mescal Kid

As Outfunk (with Sebastian Ingrosso)

As Supermode (with Axwell)

As Swedish House Mafia (with Axwell and Sebastian Ingrosso)

As The Sinners (with Sebastian Ingrosso)

As Who's Who?

Productions

Notes
 Note 1: 
Produced with Axwell and Sebastian Ingrosso under the name Swedish House Mafia.

Remixes
 2003 – Aerosol featuring Anne Murillo – Let the Music Play
 2003 – StoneBridge – Put 'Em High (Steve Angello & Sebastian Ingrosso Remix)
 2003 – Arcade Mode – Your Love (Angello & Ingrosso Remix)
 2003 – Gadjo – So Many Times
 2004 – Deepgroove – Electrik / Diva (In My House)
 2004 – Magnolia – It's All Vain (Steve Angello Remix)
 2004 – DJ Flex and Sandy W – Love For You (Angello & Ingrosso Remix)
 2004 – DJ Luccio – No Fear
 2004 – DJ Rooster and Sammy Peralta – Shake It
 2004 – Touché – She's at the Club / The Body Clap
 2004 – Mohito – Slip Away
 2004 – Room 5 – U Got Me
 2004 – Eurythmics – Sweet Dreams (Steve Angello Remix)
 2004 – Phase 2 – Voodoo Love
 2004 – Eric Prydz – Call on Me (Angello & Ingrosso Remix)
 2004 – Benjamin Bates – Whole (The Steve Angello Mixes)
 2005 – Armand Van Helden featuring Tekitha presents Sahara – Everytime I Feel It
 2005 – Full Blown – Some Kinda Freak (Who's Who Re-edit)
 2005 – DJ Rooster and Sammy Peralta – Shake It (Steve Angello Mix)
 2005 – Röyksopp – 49 Percent (Angello & Ingrosso Remix)
 2005 – Deep Dish – Say Hello (Angello & Ingrosso Remix)
 2005 – Roman Flügel – Geht's Noch ?
 2005 – Sahara – Everytime I Feel It (Steve Angello Remix)
 2005 – Moby – Raining Again
 2005 – Naughty Queen – Famous & Rich (Angello & Ingrosso Remix)
 2005 – Robbie Rivera and StoneBridge – One Eye Shut (Steve Angello & Sebastian Ingrosso Remix)
 2005 – Steve Lawler – That Sound (Angello & Ingrosso Remix)
 2005 – MBG and SDS – New Jack
 2005 – Alex Neri – Housetrack
 2005 – In-N-Out – EQ-Lizer (Angello & Ingrosso Remix)
 2006 – Innersphere aka Shinedoe – Phunk (Steve Angello Re-Edit)
 2006 – Justin Timberlake – My Love (Angello & Ingrosso Remix)
 2006 – Ultra DJ's – Me & U (Steve Angello & Sebastian Ingrosso Edit)
 2006 – Laidback Luke featuring Stephen Granville – Hypnotize (Steve Angello Remix)
 2007 – Robyn and Kleerup – With Every Heartbeat (Steve Angello Dub)
2007 – Ray Parker Jr. – Ghostbusters Theme (Steve Angello Remix)
 2007 – Fergie – London Bridge
 2007 – Hard-Fi – Suburban Knights (Angello & Ingrosso Remix)
 2007 – Robbie Rivera – One Eye Shut (Angello & Ingrosso Remix)
 2008 – Tocadisco – Da Fuckin' Noize (Steve Angello Remix)
 2008 – Flash Brothers – Palmito (Steve Angello RMX)
 2009 – Kim Fai – P.O.V
 2009 – Christian Smith and John Selway – Move!
 2010 – Harry Romero, Junior Sanchez and Alexander Technique featuring Shawnee Taylor – Where You Are (Steve Angello Edit)
 2010 – Cheryl Cole featuring will.i.am – 3 Words (Steve Angello Remix)
 2010 – Magnetic Man – Perfect Stranger (Steve Angello Remix)
 2010 – Pendulum – The Island (Steve Angello, AN21 & Max Vangeli Remix)
 2010 – Congorock – Babylon (Steve Angello Edit)
 2011 – Tim Mason – The Moment (Steve Angello Edit)
 2011 – Nari & Milani – Kendo (Steve Angello Edit)
 2011 – Nero – Me & You (Steve Angello Remix)
 2013 – Depeche Mode – Soothe My Soul (Steve Angello vs. Jacques Lu Cont Remix) 
 2013 – Chase and Status – Count On Me (Steve Angello Remix)
 2014 – Coldplay – A Sky Full of Stars (S-A Ibiza Edit)
 2014 – London Grammar – Hey Now (Arty Remix x S-A Ibiza Edit)
 2015 – Jean Michel Jarre & M83 - Glory (Steve Angello Remix)
 2015 – Susanne Sundfør - Kamikaze (Steve Angello & AN21 Remix)
 2016 – Steve Angello & AN21 featuring Franz Novotny - Last Dance (Steve Angello Remix)

See also
Swedish House Mafia discography
Axwell discography
Sebastian Ingrosso discography

References

Electronic music discographies
House music discographies
Discographies of Greek artists
Discographies of Swedish artists